Poo is the surname of:

 Ai-jen Poo (born 1974), American activist
 Fernão do Pó, 15th century Portuguese navigator and explorer also known as Fernando Poo 
 Karin Sham Poo (born 1943), the first female Senior Vice President of banking in Norway
 Mu-ming Poo, American neuroscientist
 Sam Poo (died 1865), a Chinese bushranger in Australia